The 1982–83 NCAA Division I men's basketball season began in November 1982 and ended with the Final Four in Albuquerque, New Mexico on April 4, 1983. The NC State Wolfpack won their second NCAA national championship with a 54–52 victory over the heavily favored #1 ranked Houston Cougars.

Season headlines 

 Jim Valvano led the NC State Wolfpack on an improbable run through the NCAA tournament. The team upset Houston's famed and high flying Phi Slama Jama in the championship game. Were it not for winning the ACC tournament, the Wolfpack likely would not have been in the NCAA Tournament.

Major rule changes 
Beginning in 1982–83, the following rules changes were implemented:
 The penalty for a player violating the five-second "closely guarded" count was changed from a jump ball to a turnover, the defense would get the ball at the closest out of bounds spot to where the violation occurred.

Season outlook

Pre-season polls 

The top 20 from the AP and UPI (Coaches) Polls during the pre-season.

Regular season

Conference winners and tournaments

Statistical leaders

Conference standings

Postseason tournaments

NCAA tournament

Final Four - The Pit, Albuquerque, New Mexico

National Invitation tournament

NIT Semifinals and Final

Award winners

Consensus All-American teams

Major player of the year awards 

 Wooden Award: Ralph Sampson, Virginia
 Naismith Award: Ralph Sampson, Virginia
 Helms Player of the Year: Akeem Olajuwon, Houston
 Associated Press Player of the Year: Ralph Sampson, Virginia
 UPI Player of the Year: Ralph Sampson, Virginia
 NABC Player of the Year: Ralph Sampson, Virginia
 Oscar Robertson Trophy (USBWA): Ralph Sampson, Virginia
 Adolph Rupp Trophy: Ralph Sampson, Virginia
 Sporting News Player of the Year: Michael Jordan, North Carolina

Major coach of the year awards 
 Associated Press Coach of the Year: Guy Lewis, Houston
 UPI Coach of the Year: Jerry Tarkanian, UNLV
 Henry Iba Award (USBWA): Lou Carnesecca, St. John's
 NABC Coach of the Year: Lou Carnesecca, St. John's
 CBS/Chevrolet Coach of the Year: Lou Carnesecca, St. John's
 Sporting News Coach of the Year: Denny Crum, Louisville

Other major awards 
 Frances Pomeroy Naismith Award (Best player under 6'0): Ray McCallum, Ball State
 Robert V. Geasey Trophy (Top player in Philadelphia Big 5): John Pinone, Villanova
 NIT/Haggerty Award (Top player in New York City metro area): Chris Mullin, St. John's

Coaching changes 

A number of teams changed coaches during the season and after it ended.

References